Asaphodes declarata is a species of moth in the family Geometridae. This species is endemic to New Zealand and has been observed in the southern parts of the South Island. This species prefers open tussock grassland habitat amounts beech forest and in mountainous terrain. It can be found at altitudes of between 450 and 1750 m. The adults of this species are on the wing from November to March. The moths can vary both in size and, with the female of the species, in markings.

Taxonomy

This species was described by Louis Beethoven Prout in 1914 as Xanthorhoe declarata using material collected by George Howes at Ben Lomond in Otago in February. George Hudson discussed and illustrated this species under the name Xanthorhoe declarata in his 1928 publication The Butterflies and Moths of New Zealand. However Hudson made an error, giving the incorrect name of the discoverer of the species, as well as the incorrect type locality.

In 1987 Robin C. Craw proposed assigning this species to the genus Asaphodes. In 1988 John S. Dugdale agreed with this proposal. The holotype specimen is held at the Natural History Museum, London.

Description

Prout described the species as follows:

Hudson noted that this species could easily be confused with a faded specimen of Asaphodes clarata. He also pointed out that A. declarata varies considerably in both size and, with the female of the species, in markings.

Distribution
This species is endemic to New Zealand. This species has been found in Otago and Southland.

Biology and life cycle

Hudson stated that A. declarata can be found on the wing from November until February. Adults have also been recorded in March.

Habitat
A. declarata prefers open tussock habitat amongst beech forest in mountainous terrain. It can be found at elevations of between 450 and 1750m in altitude.

References

Larentiinae
Moths described in 1914
Moths of New Zealand
Endemic fauna of New Zealand
Taxa named by Louis Beethoven Prout
Endemic moths of New Zealand